Sharad Kapoor (born 13 February 1976) is an Indian actor, who works in Hindi and Bengali movies  and television. Having debuted in Mera Pyara Bharat in 1994, Kapoor has acted in many films throughout his career, including Jai Ho, Tamanna, Lakshya, and Josh. He also worked as an assistant director on the movie Lakshmanrekha.

Biography

Television career

Filmography

Awards and nominations 
 2001:Nominated: Filmfare Best Villain Award for Josh

References

External links 
 

1976 births
Living people
Indian male television actors
Indian male film actors
Male actors in Hindi cinema
Punjabi people
People from New Alipore